Charles Robert Scriver  (born November 7, 1930) is a Canadian pediatrician and biochemical geneticist. Scriver made many important contributions to our knowledge of inborn errors of metabolism. He led in establishing a nationwide newborn metabolic screening program that is considered a landmark in applying the results of research to children's health across an entire nation.

Born in Montreal, Quebec, Scriver graduated with a Bachelor of Arts in 1951 and from the Faculty of Medicine of McGill University in 1955. He was appointed to the Department of Paediatrics at McGill and as a Markle scholar in 1961, becoming a professor in pediatrics in 1969. He was the Samuel Rudin Distinguished Visiting Professorship at Columbia University from 1979 to 1980. He is the Alva professor Emeritus of Human Genetics in the Faculty of Medicine of McGill University. In 2010 he was awarded the prestigious Pollin Prize for Pediatric Research.

Scriver played a critical role in developing scientific and ethical policies associated with the international Human Genome Project - created to decode more than three billion DNA base pairs and identify all the genes.

He is co-editor of the authoritative multi-volume textbook entitled The Metabolic & Molecular Bases of Inherited Disease, published by McGraw-Hill.

He and his wife, Esther, have four children.

Honours
 He was awarded the McLaughlin medal from the Royal Society of Canada in 1981.
 In 1985 he was made an Officer of the Order of Canada
 In 1991, he was elected a Fellow of the Royal Society.
 In 1995, he was awarded the Government of Quebec's Prix Wilder-Penfield.
 In 1996 he was promoted to Companion of the Order of Canada
 He was the 1996 recipient of the Canadian Medical Association Medal of Service, awarded to a physician who has made "an exceptional and outstanding contribution to the advancement of health care in Canada."
 In 1997 he was made a Grand Officer of the National Order of Quebec.
 In 2001 he was inducted into the Canadian Medical Hall of Fame.
 In 2001, he was inducted into the Canadian Science and Engineering Hall of Fame.
 In 2008, he was awarded the Paediatric Academic Leadership Award for Clinical Investigation by the Paediatric Chairs of Canada
 In 2010, he was honored by the American Pediatric Society with the 2010 John Howland Award
 He received honorary Doctor of Science degrees from the University of Manitoba, Glasgow University and the Université de Montréal.

Honorary degrees

 The University of Western Ontario in London, Ontario; Doctor of Science (D.Sc.) June 13, 2007

References

 

1930 births
Living people

Canadian geneticists
Canadian pediatricians
Companions of the Order of Canada
Canadian Fellows of the Royal Society
Fellows of the Royal Society of Canada
Grand Officers of the National Order of Quebec
McGill University Faculty of Medicine alumni
Academic staff of McGill University
People from Montreal